1017 Jacqueline (prov. designation:  or ) is a dark background asteroid from the central regions of the asteroid belt. It was discovered on 4 February 1924, by Russian-French astronomer Benjamin Jekhowsky at the Algiers Observatory, Algeria, in North Africa. It was named after the French physicist and long-time pupil of the discoverer, Jacqueline Zadoc-Kahn Eisenmann (1904–1998).

Orbit and classification 

Jacqueline is a non-family asteroid of the main belt's background population when applying the hierarchical clustering method to its proper orbital elements. It orbits the Sun in the intermediate asteroid belt at a distance of 2.4–2.8 AU once every 4 years and 3 months (1,536 days; semi-major axis of 2.61 AU). Its orbit has an eccentricity of 0.08 and an inclination of 8° with respect to the ecliptic. The asteroid's earliest preserved observation dates back to 7 March 1924 at Heidelberg Observatory, where the body's observation arc begins in February 1928, nearly four years after its official discovery observation at Algiers–Bouzaréah.

Naming 

This minor planet was named after Jacqueline Zadoc-Kahn Eisenmann (1904–1998), a French physicist and long-time student of Jekhowsky's. The  was mentioned in The Names of the Minor Planets by Paul Herget in 1955.

Physical characteristics 

In the Bus–Binzel SMASS classification, Jacqueline is a common, carbonaceous C-type asteroid.

Rotation period 

In May 2000, a rotational lightcurve of Jacqueline was obtained from photometric observations by American photometrist Robert Stephens at the Santana Observatory  in California. Analysis of the classically shaped bimodal lightcurve gave a well-defined rotation period of  hours and a brightness variation of  magnitude, indicative of a non-spheroidal shape. Other measurements by Eric Barbotin and by astronomers at the Palomar Transient Factory gave a similar period of 7.873 and 7.875 hours with an amplitude of 0.72 and 0.43 magnitude, respectively.

In 2016, a lightcurve was published using modeled photometric data from the Lowell Photometric Database. It gave a concurring sidereal period of 7.87149 hours, as well as two spin axes of (7.0°, 55.0°) and (170.0°, 65.0°) in ecliptic coordinates (λ, β).

Diameter and albedo 

The Collaborative Asteroid Lightcurve Link derives an albedo of 0.0497 and  a diameter of 37.61 kilometers based on an absolute magnitude of 11.0.

References

External links 
 Lightcurve Database Query (LCDB), at www.minorplanet.info
 Dictionary of Minor Planet Names, Google books
 Asteroids and comets rotation curves, CdR – Geneva Observatory, Raoul Behrend
 Discovery Circumstances: Numbered Minor Planets (1)-(5000) – Minor Planet Center
 
 

001017
Discoveries by Benjamin Jekhowsky
Named minor planets
001017
19240204